The 1996 edition of Copa Libertadores was the 37th in the tournament's history. Twenty-one teams participated in the competition. River Plate, of Argentina, won the tournament for their second time. The tournament began on March 13 and ended on June 26.

Group stage

Twenty teams were divided into five groups of four teams each for the Group Stage. The top three teams of each group, as well as Grêmio (who received a bye as winners of the previous year's edition of the tournament) qualified to the Round of 16.

Group 1

Group 2

Group 3

Group 4

Group 5

Knockout stages

Bracket

Round of 16

First leg matches were played between April 30 and May 2. Second leg matches were played on May 8 and May 9.

|}

Quarter-finals

First leg matches were played on May 15. Second leg matches were played on May 22 and May 24.

|}

Semi-finals

|}

First leg

Second leg

River Plate won 3–2 on aggregate.

First leg

Second leg

América won 3–2 on aggregate.

Finals

|}

River Plate won 2–1 on aggregate.

Champion

References
 Copa Libertadores 1996 at RSSSF

1
Copa Libertadores seasons